Henrietta Island is an island located in Newfoundland and Labrador, Canada. The closest major city (200,000+) to the island is Québec City, and the closest minor city (100,000+) is Saint Johns. The closest settlement of any kind is Rigolet.

Islands of Newfoundland and Labrador